The 2013 Mascom Top 8 Cup, also known as the Mascom Top 8 Cup Season 2 for sponsorship reasons, was the second edition of the Mascom Top 8 Cup. It was played from 23 February to 18 May 2013 by the top teams from the 2011-12 Botswana Premier League. It was won by Gaborone United.

History
The 2013 tournament was played from February to May instead of May to July like the previous tournament. It was the only tournament to take place in Botswana for the season, since the 2013 FA Challenge Cup was not played, therefore the winner represented the country in the CAF Confederation Cup. Mogoditshane Fighters was the only debutant in the tournament.

Prize money
The prize money was kept the same for the winners from the 2012 competition, but was increased for the rest of the competitors from the inaugural edition of the cup.

 Champions: P1 000 000
 Runners up: P400 000
 Semifinalists: P200 000
 Quarterfinalists: P125 000

Format
The quarterfinals and semifinals were played over two legs both home and away, with only one final in a predetermined venue. Three points were awarded for a win, one point for a draw and none for a loss. Aggregate score was used to determine the winner of a round. Where the aggregate score was equal away goals were used to pick out the victor and if those were equal the tied teams went into a penalty shootout. For the 2012-13 edition there was no quarterfinal draw. The teams were seeded based on their position in the table, with the first placed Mochudi Centre Chiefs facing off against eighth placed Mogoditshane Fighters.

Participants

Quarterfinals
All quarterfinal matches were played at Molepolole Sports Complex.

Semifinals

Final
The final pitted Gaborone United against BDF XI at the New Lobatse Stadium. Gaborone United took a 2-0 lead in the second half before BDF XI's goalkeeper was sent off. The substitute goalkeeper saved the penalty, and ten-man BDI XI scored with 12 minutes to play, but down a man could not find an equaliser.

Awards

References 

Football competitions in Botswana